Beatriz "Bea" Segura i Folch (born 22 March 1975) is a Spanish actress.

Filmography

References

External links 
  
 Bea Segura at the Internet Movie Database 

1975 births
Film actresses from Catalonia
People from Catalonia
Television actresses from Catalonia
Living people
Actresses from Barcelona
Spanish actresses
Spanish film actresses
Spanish television actresses
20th-century Spanish actresses
21st-century Spanish actresses